The Vampire Curse is a Big Finish original novella collection, featuring Bernice Summerfield, a character from the spin-off media based on the long-running British science fiction television series Doctor Who, fighting vampires. It was published in 2008.

Stories

External links
Big Finish Productions - The Vampire Curse

2008 British novels
2008 science fiction novels
Bernice Summerfield novels
Big Finish New Worlds
British science fiction novels
Novels by Kelly Hale
Novels by Mags L Halliday
Novels by Philip Purser-Hallard
Doctor Who novellas
Vampire novels